Tyrique Marquis Stevenson (born May 1, 2000) is an American football cornerback. He played college football at Georgia and Miami.

Early life and high school
Stevenson grew up in Miami, Florida, and initially attended South Dade Senior High School. He transferred to Miami Southridge Senior High School for his senior year.

College career
Stevenson began his college career at Georgia and joined the team as an early enrollee. He played in all 14 of the Bulldogs' games during his freshman season and made 13 tackles with one sack and five passes defended. Stevenson played in all 10 of Georgia's games with four starts during the team's COVID-19 shortened 2020 season and finished the year with 34 tackles and five passes broken up. 

After the season, Stevenson chose to transfer to Miami. He made 43 tackles with 2.5 tackles for loss, four passes broken up, and one interception in his first season with the team.

References

External links
Miami Hurricanes bio
Georgia Bulldogs bio

Living people
Players of American football from Miami
American football cornerbacks
Georgia Bulldogs football players
Miami Hurricanes football players
2000 births